, formerly known as Ajigawa stable from 1979 to 2007, is a stable of sumo wrestlers, part of the Isegahama ichimon or group of stables. Its current head coach is former yokozuna Asahifuji. As of January 2023 it had 19 wrestlers.

History
The original Ajigawa stable was established in April 1979 by former sekiwake Mutsuarashi. He had originally hoped to become head of Miyagino stable and had married the daughter of the incumbent stablemaster there, but the marriage ended in divorce. He moved to Tomozuna stable upon his retirement in 1977 before opening up his new stable two years later. Ajigawa stable absorbed Kasugayama stable in 1990 on the retirement of its head coach. In April 1993 Asahifuji acceded to the Ajigawa name and took over the stable, due to the poor health of the incumbent. In late 2007 Asahifuji switched to the prestigious Isegahama elder name which had become available upon the retirement of its previous holder, former maegashira Katsuhikari,  thereby also changing the name of his stable. Asahifuji's decision to switch to the Isegahama name can be seen as an attempt to restore his ichimon'''s reputation (the ichimon was known as Tatsunami-Isegahama for many years before becoming solely Tatsunami; as a result of the success of the renamed stable the ichimon has been solely known as Isegahama since January 2013). He also moved the stable to new premises.

In September 2012, ōzeki Harumafuji won his second consecutive tournament and was promoted yokozuna for the next tournament. In March 2013, the stable absorbed the coach and wrestlers (Terunofuji, Wakaaoba and Shunba) of the Magaki stable. Magaki was shut down due to the poor health of Magaki-oyakata. Isegahama stable had four of its wrestlers ranked in the makuuchi and jūryō divisions in 2017, although Harumafuji retired in November 2017 and ōzeki Terunofuji fell to the lower divisions through injury in 2018 before staging a successful comeback, eventually reaching the rank of yokozuna in July 2021.

In March 2022, the stable managed to have six active sekitori wrestlers at the same time, with the promotion of, then 19 year-old, Atamifuji to the jūryō division for the March tournament, after a winning record at the top of the makushita division.

In November 2022, the stable managed, in another rare occurrence, to have all six sekitori of the stable ranked at the elite first division makuuchi, with the promotion of then 20 year-old Atamifuji to the rank of maegashira 15. The last time a stable had six sekitori in the makuuchi division was Musashigawa stable in March 2004.

In December 2022 two junior wrestlers in the stable were found to have acted violently against younger wrestlers, with the victims beaten with wooden beams and burned with chankonabe hot water poured on their backs. One of the wrestlers held responsible submitted his retirement papers, while another was handed a two-tournament suspension. Following the investigation, stablemaster Isegahama (Asahifuji) resigned his seat on the Sumo Association's Board of Directors.

Ring name conventions
During its time as Ajigawa stable, most of the wrestlers' ring names started with the kanji 安 (pronounced a or an, meaning peaceful). Since the name change to Isegahama, a new pattern has taken hold, with many wrestlers having ring names ending with the characters 富士 (read: fuji), in deference to their coach and the stable's owner, the former Asahifuji, although other stables use this suffix too. The 照 ("teru") prefix is also common; examples are Terunofuji, Terutsuyoshi, Terumichi and Teruju.

Owners
1993–present: 4th Ajigawa / 9th Isegahama Seiya (yakuin taigu iin, the 63rd yokozuna Asahifuji)
1979-1993: 3rd Ajigawa Hiroaki (former sekiwake Mutsuarashi)

Notable active wrestlers

Terunofuji (the 73rd yokozuna)
Takarafuji (best rank sekiwake)
Terutsuyoshi (best rank maegashira)
Midorifuji (best rank maegashira)
Nishikifuji (best rank maegashira)
Atamifuji (best rank maegashira)
Satonofuji (best rank makushita) regularly performed the yumitori-shiki or bow-twirling ceremony

Coaches
Tateyama Yoshiyuki (toshiyori, former maegashira Homarefuji)

Notable former members
Harumafuji (the 70th yokozuna)
Aminishiki (former sekiwake)
Asōfuji (former maegashira)
Homarefuji (former maegashira)
Kasugafuji (former maegashira)

Assistants
 (sewanin, former jūryō, real name Katsuaki Honma)
Saisu (sewanin, former maegashira, real name Minoru Saisu, retired August 2021)

Referee
Shikimori Seiichirō (Sandanme gyōji, real name Rikuto Fukuda)

Ushers
Teruki (makuuchi yobidashi, real name Takahisa Kudō)
Fujio (juryo yobidashi, real name Shinsuke Onodera)
Teruya (makushita yobidashi, real name Daisuke Kondō)

Hairdresser
Tokoyodo (special class tokoyama)
Tokoami (third class tokoyama'')

Location and access
Mōri 1-7-4, Kōtō-ku, Tokyo 135-0001
Near Sumiyoshi station on the Toei Shinjuku Line and the Hanzōmon Line

See also
List of sumo stables
List of active sumo wrestlers
List of past sumo wrestlers
Glossary of sumo terms

References

External links
Official site 
Japan Sumo Association profile

Active sumo stables